St Paul's Church, Newport is a parish church in the Church of England located in Barton, Isle of Wight and Newport, Isle of Wight, United Kingdom. The church is Grade II listed.

History
The church dates from 1844. It was designed by the architect James William Wild and is sited on Staplers Road in Barton, Newport.

St Paul's was originally a district church in the parish of Whippingham, although serving the Barton area of Newport.

It was intended to accommodate 800 worshippers, including 200 free seats.

The land was given by C. W. Martin and the church was consecrated on 1 February 1844.

List of incumbents

Revd W.D. Parker 1844 – 1853
Revd W.L. Sharpe 1854 - 1890
Revd W.H. Nutter 1891 – 1909
Revd C. Collis 1910 - 1915
Revd M. Atkinson 1915 – 1937
Revd A.G. Kelsey 1937 - 1946
Revd L.J.D. Wheatley 1946 - 1963
Revd W. Boardman 1963 - 1986
Revd A. Andrews 1986 – 1989
Revd Chris Lane 1990 - 1995
Revd Dr. Peter Pimentel 1996 - 2014

Stained Glass

There is a stained glass window by Charles Eamer Kempe.

War Memorials 
Two plaques within the church record the local Servicemen who fell during World Wars I and World War II.

Churchyard and 'old' Cemetery 
The churchyard surrounds the church building. 

In 1871 the St. Paul's (Barton) Burial Board was formed to establish a civic cemetery as there was little room left for burials in the churchyard. The civic cemetery was established on land north of the churchyard and the first burial took place there in August 1872. By 1897, space was running out in the civic cemetery and the St. Paul's (Barton) Joint Burial Committee (by then under  Newport Town and Whippingham Parish Councils) purchased an area of ground off Halberry Lane for a new civic cemetery.

Burials 
Professor John Milne 1913 - in civic cemetery

References

Church of England church buildings on the Isle of Wight
Newport, Isle of Wight
Churches completed in 1844
1844 establishments in England